Ophellantha is a genus of plants under the family Euphorbiaceae first described as a genus in 1924. It is native to southern Mexico and northern Central America.

Species
 Ophellantha spinosa Standl. - Honduras, El Salvador, Chiapas, Veracruz
 Ophellantha steyermarkii Standl. - Guatemala, Chiapas

References

Codiaeae
Euphorbiaceae genera